Kuo Tzu-hui is a Taiwanese football manager and former player who played as a defender. She has been a member of the Chinese Taipei women's national team.

International career
Kuo Tzu-hui capped for Chinese Taipei at senior level during the 2008 AFC Women's Asian Cup qualification.

International goals
Scores and results list Chinese Taipei's goal tally first

Managerial career
Kuo Tzu-hui was an assistant coach of the Chinese Taipei women's national football team in 2011.

References

Living people
Taiwanese women's footballers
Women's association football defenders
Chinese Taipei women's international footballers
Taiwanese football managers
Female association football managers
Women's association football managers
Year of birth missing (living people)